McGaa is a surname. Notable people with the surname include:

Ed McGaa (1936–2017), American Marine and writer
William McGaa (1824–1867), American trapper and explorer